Energy in Croatia describes energy and electricity production, consumption and import in Croatia.

As of 2021, Croatia imported about 52.9% of the total energy consumed annually: 80% of its oil demand, 67% of its gas, 32.5% of its electricity, and 100% of its coal needs.

Croatia satisfies its electricity needs largely from hydro and thermal power plants, and partly from the Krško nuclear power plant, which is co-owned by Croatian and Slovenian state-owned power companies. Renewable energies account for approximately 28.5% of Croatia’s energy mix.

Electricity
Hrvatska elektroprivreda (HEP) is the national energy company charged with production, transmission and distribution of electricity.

Production

Total installed capacity of generating objects built in Croatia amounts to 3,557 MW, 2,166 MW of which is hydropower and renewable sources share and 1,391 MW comes from thermal and nuclear power plants.

In 2020, domestic production amounted to 13,731 GWh, which was 68% of total domestic demand. Remaining 32% was covered through trade.
Total consumption equaled 14,683 GWh, a 5.6% increase from 2020.

Hydropower 
Croatia has 28 hydropower plants of which 2 are reversible, 2 small size and 1 pumped storage. They are distributed in three production areas: North, West and South with one independent plant, and are HEP's most important source of renewable energy.

Wind energy 
Most of Croatian wind energy is produced by companies in private ownership for difference of other types of energy production. Out of 24 wind firms only one is owned by HEP (VE Korlat) while others are mainly individually owned.

Thermal energy 
There are 7 thermal power plants of which 4 are also heating plants and one is combined cycle power plant. Additionally, the first geothermal power plant was opened in 2019, but there are projects and potential for new ones.

Bioenergy 
Five biopower plants are now located in Croatia and they are also used for heating purposes.

Nuclear energy 
Croatia has no nuclear power plants on its territory, but co-owns the Krško Nuclear Power Plant together with Slovenia. The Krško plant was built in the era of Yugoslavia on the territory of present-day Slovenia. Planned decommissioning is by 2043.

Solar energy 
In 2014, HEP built nine solar power plants on the roofs of business buildings. The power plants are located in the office building at the headquarters of HEP in Zagreb and the buildings of the HEP Distribution System Operator. Solar power plants have the status of a privileged producer of electricity, which enables the sale of produced electricity to HROTE at a preferential price. Since 2018, Hrvatska elektroprivreda has started building integrated solar power plants according to the concept of a customer with its own production. This model enables a significant reduction in costs for own consumption of electricity. Most of the produced energy is consumed in the buildings themselves, while the rest of the energy is delivered to the distribution network. HEP's first non-integrated power plant was SE Kaštelir, purchased in 2019 from a private producer, and the first independently built was SE Vis, commissioned in 2020.

Transmission
Croatian transmission grid consists of lines on three different rated voltage levels, namely 400, 220 and 110 kV.

The grid was often the target of attacks during Croatian War of Independence, resulting in frequent black-outs during the period. Since then, the grid has been repaired, and reconnected to synchronous grid of Continental Europe synchronous zones 1 and 2, making it an important transit system again.

Distribution
Under the 2004 Energy law, customers in Croatia are allowed to choose their preferred distributor of electricity. However, HEP Operator distribucijskog sustava or HEP-ODS (a Hrvatska elektroprivreda subsidiary) remains the largest distributor to both industry and households.

In 2021 there were 2,132,002 customers, 95.8% of which were households.

Development projects

Hydropower 
With the implementation of the project HE Senj 2, HEP intends to use the remaining hydro potential in the Lika and Gacka basins by upgrading the existing hydropower system. The project involves the construction of a large reservoir and additional capacity in order to transfer production to the top of the daily chart. This will enable the capacity to inject high regulatory power into the power system with flexible hydro units ready for rapid power change. The construction of the hydroelectric power plant will cost 3.4 billion kuna and will have an installed capacity of 412 MW, while the construction deadline is 2028.

Wind energy 
In July 2022, the Spanish company Acciona Energia announced an investment of one hundred million euros in the construction of two wind farms. One will be built in the vicinity of Split, and the other between Šibenik and Knin and will contain 16 wind turbines with a production of 203 GWh of clean electricity per year. The projects named Opor and Boraja 2 will be sufficient to supply 60 thousand households, and the propellers will start spinning at these locations in 2024, after a year and a half of construction and testing. This will avoid the annual emission of 135,000 tons of CO2. In 2013, the same company built the Jelinak wind park worth 48 million euros.

The European Bank for Reconstruction and Development (EBRD) will grant a loan of EUR 43 million to the company Kunovac, jointly owned by the funds Taaleri Energia SolarWind II and ENCRO Kunovac, for the construction and operation of two onshore wind farms in the Zadar region. Zagrebačka banka and Croatian bank for reconstruction and development will participate in the financing with a total loan amount of 126 million euros, and the total network capacity of the two power plants is 111 megawatts, which is enough to power 85,000 households.

In January 2023, the Greek energy company EuroEnergy announced that it was taking over the 114 MW wind farm project in Lika-Senj County. The acquisition reserves the right to expand with an additional 70.5 MW of wind capacity, subject to grid upgrades that can increase production. The value of the project is EUR 150 million and will be realized in the area of Udbina.

Thermal power 
In December 2019, the project of building a new high-efficiency combi-cogeneration unit KKE EL-TO Zagreb began, electric power 150 MW. The construction lasts for three years, and this project will replace part of the dilapidated and obsolete units at the EL-TO Zagreb location. It is expected for a unit to start working in the summer of 2023.

Nuclear power 
In 1978, the Adriatic island of Vir was selected as a location for a future nuclear power plant, but these plans were abandoned.

According to reports, since 2009 Croatia has been discussing the option of building a nuclear power plant with Albania, in a location on the shore of Shkodër Lake, on the border with Albania and Montenegro. In April 2009 the Croatian government denied that any agreement had been signed.

In a 2012 poll among 447 Croatian citizens, who were asked "Do you think it is justified to use nuclear energy for the production of electricity?", 42% answered "yes" and 44% answered "no".

In 2021 the Slovenian government has issued an energy permit to GEN Energija for the planning and construction of the second unit of the Krško Nuclear Power Plant,followed by a statement by the Minister of Economy and Sustainable Development of Croatia Tomislav Ćorić that Croatia "will not look benevolently at the construction of the new bloc". In March 2022, Plenković confirmed Croatia's readiness to enter the project of building the second block of the Krško NPP.

Solar power 
As of 2021, Croatia had 100 MW of solar power, providing 0.4% of electricity. The potential for solar energy in Croatia is estimated at 6.8 GW, of which 5.3 GW would be accounted for by utility-scale photovoltaic plants and 1.5 GW by rooftop solar systems. Croatia plans to install 1.5 GW of solar capacity by 2024. The total solar power grid-connected capacity in Croatia was 109 MW as 2022.

See also

Wind power in Croatia
Industry of Croatia

Notes

References